Roticcio is a village in south-eastern Switzerland, near the Mera River, approximately five miles from the Italian border.

Villages in Switzerland
Val Bregaglia